Joe Peter Buhler (born 1950 in Vancouver, Washington) is an American mathematician.

Buhler received his undergraduate degree from Reed College in 1972, and his Ph.D. from Harvard University in 1977 with thesis Icosahedral Galois Representations and thesis advisor John Tate. Buhler was a professor at Reed College in Portland, Oregon from 1980 until his retirement in 2005.

In 1997, he introduced, with Zinovy Reichstein, the concept of essential dimension.

Buhler is involved in a project to numerically verify the Kummer–Vandiver conjecture of Harry Vandiver and Ernst Eduard Kummer concerning the class number of cyclotomic fields. Vandiver proved it with a desk calculator up to class number 600, Derrick Lehmer (in the late 1940s) to about 5000, and Buhler with colleagues (in 2001) to 12 million. He continues the project with David Harvey and others.

Buhler's research deals with algorithmic algebraic number theory, algebra, and cryptography.

He was elected a Fellow of the American Mathematical Society in 2012.

References

External links
 Homepage
 photo and biography on the occasion of a lecture
 author's profile in the database zbMATH

20th-century American mathematicians
21st-century American mathematicians
Reed College alumni
Harvard University alumni
Reed College faculty
Fellows of the American Mathematical Society
1950 births
Living people
People from Vancouver, Washington